Tuzlukushevo (Tuźlıqıwış) is a rural locality (a selo) and the administrative centre of Tuzlukushevsky Selsoviet, Chekmagushevsky District, Bashkortostan, Russia. The population was 530 as of 2010. There are 4 streets.

Geography 
Tuzlukushevo is located 16 km northeast of Chekmagush (the district's administrative centre) by road. Taskakly is the nearest rural locality.

References 

Rural localities in Chekmagushevsky District